Wilfried Böhm (born 9 February 1934) was a German politician of the Christian Democratic Union (CDU) and former member of the German Bundestag.

Life 
Böhm joined the CDU in 1959, joined the Junge Union (JU) and was district chairman of the JU North Hesse from 1962 to 1967. In the 1972 federal elections, Böhm was elected to the German Bundestag via the state list of the CDU Hessen, of which he was a member until 1994. He ran for office six times in the Hersfeld constituency. In the Bundestag he was a member of the Committee on Foreign Affairs and the Committee on Inner-German Relations.

Literature

References

1934 births
Members of the Bundestag for Hesse
Members of the Bundestag 1990–1994
Members of the Bundestag 1987–1990
Members of the Bundestag 1983–1987
Members of the Bundestag 1980–1983
Members of the Bundestag 1976–1980
Members of the Bundestag 1972–1976
Members of the Bundestag for the Christian Democratic Union of Germany
Members of the Landtag of Hesse
Living people